Lectionary 1839, designated by ℓ 1839 (in the Gregory-Aland numbering), is a Greek minuscule manuscript of the New Testament, written on 256 parchment leaves (30.6 cm by 22.7 cm). Paleographically it had been assigned to the 11th century.

Description 

The codex contains Lessons from the Gospels. It is a lectionary (Evangelistarium). Written in two columns per page, in 27 lines per page.

History 

The codex was presented by the friends of the Duke University Library in honor of Kenneth Willis Clark. Currently it is housed at the Kenneth Willis Clark Collection of the Duke University (Gk MS 65)  at Durham.

See also 
 List of New Testament lectionaries 
 Biblical manuscript 
 Textual criticism

References

Further reading 
 Kenneth Willis Clark, Greek New Testament Manuscripts in Duke University Library, Library Notes, no. 27 (April 1953).

External links 
 Lectionary 1839 at the Kenneth Willis Clark Collection of Greek Manuscripts

Greek New Testament lectionaries
11th-century biblical manuscripts
Duke University Libraries